"The Super Bowl Shuffle" is a song performed by the Chicago Bears football team (credited as the Chicago Bears Shufflin' Crew) in . It was released in December 1985 on Chicago-based Red Label Records and distributed through Capitol Records two months ahead of their win in Super Bowl XX. The song peaked at number 41 on the US Billboard Hot 100, and earned a Grammy nomination for Best R&B Performance by a Duo or Group with Vocals in 1987.

Song and video

"The Super Bowl Shuffle" instantly became a mainstream phenomenon, selling over 500,000 copies and reaching number 41 on the Billboard Hot 100 by February 1986. Billboard reported that the single's chart performance was propelled primarily by sales rather than radio airplay, saying, "Although the record has a great deal of pop airplay across the country, especially as a novelty for morning drive programs, only a handful of radio stations are reporting it on their playlists." "The Super Bowl Shuffle" fell in line with the Bears' high-media attention as they completed their one-loss regular season. The Bears dominated their postseason opponents, including the New England Patriots in Super Bowl XX 46–10.

The 1985 Chicago Bears were the first sports team to have their own music video. The song was nominated for a Grammy Award in 1987 for Best R&B Performance by a Duo or Group, losing to "Kiss" by Prince. The 20th anniversary DVD was released in 2004, including the making of the video, outtakes and the music video itself. Julia Meyer has kept the copyright to the video.

Over $300,000 in profits from the song and music video were donated to the Chicago Community Trust to help Chicago families in need with clothing, shelter and food. This was consistent with Walter Payton's lyric in the song: "Now we're not doing this because we're greedy / The Bears are doing it to feed the needy". In 2014, six of the performers (Richard Dent, Jim McMahon, Otis Wilson, Willie Gault, Mike Richardson and Steve Fuller) sued Julia Meyer and Renaissance Marketing Corporation, who licenses the song, stating the proceeds from the song should benefit charities; the six players' attorney stated, "Among other things, the plaintiffs seek that a constructive trust be established for charitable purposes that they select in order to continue the Super Bowl Shuffle's charitable objective."

The video was taped at Park West, a Chicago night club, the morning after the Bears' only loss of the 1985 season, 38-24 to the Miami Dolphins on Monday Night Football on December 2, 1985.  Jim McMahon and Walter Payton refused to participate in the video shoot, thinking it would be better to release the song and video after the season was complete.  However, the team was insistent on releasing the song and video shortly after the shoot, so the video was filmed with the remaining players.  Payton and McMahon both filmed their segments separately a week later at the Bears' practice facility after practice and these segments were interspersed in the video prior to release.

Performers

The lyrics were written by Richard E. Meyer and Melvin Owens. The music was composed by Bobby Daniels and Lloyd Barry.

The "Referee" in the video was portrayed by Julia Kallish.

Bears defensive end Dan Hampton declined involvement with the Shuffle, thinking it may have been too arrogant.

Other personnel
 Executive Producers: Richard E. Meyer, William D. Neal, James J. Hurley III, Barbara Supeter
 Director: Dave Thompson
 Associate Producer: Richard A. Tufo
 Technical Director: Darryl Crawl
 Editor: John Anderson
 Coordinating Producer: Kim Alan Bigelow
 Technical Coordinator: Dave Sorensen
 Lighting Designer: Hugh Gallagher
 Assistant Director: Johanna K. Hull
 Sound Engineer: Fred Breitberg
 Cameras: Bill DeMarco, Eric Chelstorp, Dennis Jackson, Jon Vandruska
 Assistant Cameras: Wendy Zauss, Tom Kruc
 Video: Mike Fayette, Steve Cardwell, Jim Keen, Jerry Wehland
 Location and Editing Facilities: Post Effects
 Park West Crew: Gregg Kincaid, Charles Mack, James Nudd, Dan Narducy, Michael Reed
 Make Up: Venus Vargas

Precedents
The 1985 Bears were not the first pro football team with a group song.

The Cincinnati Red Stockings, the first professional baseball team (1869–1870), sang a song to the spectators prior to some of their games: "We are a band of baseball players / From Cincinnati city..." However, no means to record it existed until 1877, after the team disbanded, and it thus was never recorded.

Since the 1970s, some English soccer teams have celebrated qualifying for the FA Cup Final each year by recording a song for the occasion. The "cup final record", as it was known, became a tradition, with many of the songs being top ten successes in the UK music charts. The songs are occasionally original recordings but more often reworkings of recent chart successes with lyrics edited for the occasion. They often included the original artist singing along, especially when they are a fan of the team involved.

The 1977 Denver Broncos running back Jon Keyworth sang "Make Those Miracles Happen" by L. Meeks and M. Weyand. However, the Broncos did not win the 1978 Super Bowl.

In 1981, after the Los Angeles Dodgers won the World Series, four members of the team—Jerry Reuss, Jay Johnstone, Rick Monday, and Steve Yeager—recorded a cover of Queen's "We Are the Champions". They were backed by Leland Sklar on bass and Jeff Porcaro of Toto on drums. The short-lived group performed their song on the TV show Solid Gold.

The 1984 San Francisco 49ers put out a record during that season, one in which they also went on to become Super Bowl champs. The song, "We Are the 49ers", was in the vein of post-disco/'80s dance-pop music. Later in the 1980s, the 49ers would put out another team song titled "49ers Rap". Neither of these songs, however, became a hit on the scale of the "Super Bowl Shuffle".

Imitators and influence

The success of "The Super Bowl Shuffle" initiated numerous imitations.

NFL teams
During the 1985 season, the Seattle Seahawks released "The Blue Wave Is on a Roll", a jazz-themed song with various vocal harmonies, a saxophone solo, as well as various blooper-style sound effects. However, the Seahawks would ultimately go 8–8 and miss the playoffs.
In early 1986, before the Super Bowl as a response to the Bears, the New England Patriots recorded their own team song, "New England, The Patriots, And We", whose lyrics recounted their success in the playoff brackets and predicted victory against the Bears in Super Bowl XX. Its music video featured appearances by several Patriots, Boston-area celebrities (including Robert Urich) and local media personalities, while the song itself received airplay on Boston radio stations. Despite the song's optimistic predictions, the Patriots lost to the Bears in Super Bowl XX, 46–10.
During the  season, two teams tried to repeat the pattern. The Los Angeles Raiders released "The Silver and Black Attack", based on "The Yellow and Black Attack" by Stryper, but the Raiders finished 8–8 that season and were out of the playoffs. The Los Angeles Rams recorded "Let's Ram It"; however, the Rams lost the NFC Wild Card game to the Washington Redskins.
After winning Super Bowl XXI, the New York Giants released "Walk Like a Giant", based on "Walk Like an Egyptian" by the Bangles.
In , Cincinnati Bengals rookie Ickey Woods became famous for the "Ickey Shuffle". However, his team lost in Super Bowl XXIII.
Also in 1988, the Philadelphia Eagles released a rap song called "Buddy's Watching You", referring to Eagles head coach and former Bears defensive coordinator Buddy Ryan. Eagles Hall of Famer Reggie White, an ordained minister, made a reference in the song to his faith with the line "I hit quarterbacks like they committed sin." The Eagles would make the playoffs that year, but would ultimately lose in the Fog Bowl – ironically to the Bears.
In , the Miami Dolphins created a song spoofing the MC Hammer song "U Can't Touch This" called "U Can't Touch Us". Miami would go 12–4 and be eliminated in the divisional playoffs.
During the  season, the Pittsburgh Steelers reportedly were planning to create a similar song, likely with some help from backup quarterback Mike Tomczak, who was a member of the '85 Bears and participated in the original "Super Bowl Shuffle." Reportedly, coach Bill Cowher vetoed the idea. The Steelers lost the 1994 AFC Championship game 17–13 to San Diego. That same season, local Pittsburgh artist Roger Wood created the "Here We Go" song, which has since become the Steelers unofficial fight song and is updated almost annually to account for roster turnover.
The song was later recreated in 2008, replacing the players with the 2007 team. It was also played frequently during the team's back-to-back Super Bowl runs in 1996–97 on local radio station WMYX-FM "99.1 The Mix".
In November , the confident Jacksonville Jaguars recorded their own version, "Uh Oh, The Jaguars Super Bowl Song". However, the Jaguars lost 33–14 to the Tennessee Titans in the AFC Championship game.
Cincinnati funk music pioneer Bootsy Collins teamed with the 2005 Cincinnati Bengals for a playoff song known as "Fear Da Tiger", but they, too, failed to qualify for the Super Bowl, with the rival Pittsburgh Steelers going on to win Super Bowl XL, defeating the Bengals in the playoffs along the way.
Da Superfans, a Chicago Bears fangroup, performed a parody version in early 2007 to celebrate the Bears' return to the Super Bowl.
In early 2010, Prince created a song for the Minnesota Vikings called "Purple and Gold" as the fight song for the team after the team's playoff victory over the Dallas Cowboys. Minnesota would lose the following week to the eventual Super Bowl XLIV champion New Orleans Saints in the NFC Championship Game.
In early 2011, some of the cast of Late Night with Jimmy Fallon, along with Will Arnett and Horatio Sanz, dressed as players in the Pro Bowl, made a parody video called "The Pro Bowl Shuffle" about the Pro Bowl.

Other parodies
In 1985, the Kansas Wesleyan football team won a conference title in the NAIA.  They made the "KCAC shuffle" and showed it on the local access channel for Salina, Kansas, Channel 6.
During the 1985–86 season, the Boston College men's ice hockey team recorded the "Beanpot Trot" prior to their participation in the famed Beanpot Tournament.  The Eagles placed second, losing 4–1 to rival school Boston University in the championship game on February 10, 1986.
The Houston Rockets, with the aid of Dynomite III, had a rap song in 1986 titled "Rocket Strut". They made it all the way to the NBA Finals that year, but lost to Boston in 6 games.
Also in 1986, the New York Mets released their own rap song called “Get Metsmerized”. The Mets won 108 games that season, advanced to the World Series, and defeated the Boston Red Sox in seven games to win their second world championship. 
In 1987, "Super Bowl Shuffle" producer Richard E. Meyer created a similar music video starring Chicago Bears coach Mike Ditka, titled "The Grabowski Shuffle." The video, about "working hard to get what you want", was inspired by a comment Ditka had made about his team's reputation: "There are Smiths and there are Grabowskis; we're the Grabowskis."
Also that year, the MLB World Champion Minnesota Twins released a music video called "The Berenguer Boogie", honoring their relief pitcher Juan Berenguer (whom they nicknamed "El Gasolino") and his victory celebration after striking out opposing batters. The video enjoyed a resurgence of popularity in the 21st century via the internet.
Soon after the 1986–87 NHL season, the Calgary Flames recorded a music video for the original song "Red Hot" for charity, which featured Flames players pretending to play instruments and lip-syncing to the song.
Prior to the 1988 NCAA Division I-A football season, the preseason No. 1 Florida State Seminoles made a video known as the "Seminole Rap," promising the school's first national championship would result from the season. They lost their first game to the rival Miami Hurricanes (the defending National Champions) 31–0. The Noles would finish the season 11–1 and ranked No. 3 in the nation, behind No. 1 Notre 
Dame and No. 2 Miami.
Verne Gagne and his American Wrestling Association promoted a major event with a song known as "The WrestleRock Rumble" that featured the geriatric Gagne rapping.
Gorgeous Ladies of Wrestling had a "Super Bowl Shuffle"-like song as part of its weekly program.  Each wrestler's recorded part preceded the match that she was involved in.  Even the referees were part of the tune.
On the 3rd Season premiere of the FX television show The League, one of the main characters did a parody of this with Maurice Jones-Drew, Brent Grimes and Sidney Rice entitled "The Shiva Bowl Shuffle" as a reference to their fantasy league's Super Bowl.
Key & Peele did a sketch called the "East/West Bowl Rap".
Saturday Night Live did a sketch called the "Establishment Shuffle", using the Shuffle style to parody the GOP and the 2015–16 Republican presidential primary season.
Scott Gairdner created a viral spoof entitled the "Sex Offender Shuffle", which parodies "The Super Bowl Shuffle" music video with actors portraying sex offenders who rap about the crimes they committed and how they've changed their ways in a "Super Bowl Shuffle"-styled song. To date, the video has received over 52 million views.

2010 reprise
Seven of the surviving 1985 Bears (Walter Payton had died in 1999 of liver cancer) were reunited to film an updated version as a 30-second commercial promoting Boost Mobile, which was aired during Super Bowl XLIV. The seven players featured were quarterback Jim McMahon, backup quarterback Steve Fuller, receiver Willie Gault, linebackers Mike Singletary and Otis Wilson, defensive lineman Richard Dent, and punter Maury Buford. All of the featured players wore #50 jerseys as part of the company's $50 deal.

2014 celebrity cover version
On January 21, 2014, Misfire Records released a cover version of the song featuring acclaimed musicians (Jim James of My Morning Jacket, John Roderick of The Long Winters, and Tim Harrington of Les Savy Fav), comedians (Tom Scharpling of The Best Show on WFMU, Scott Aukerman of Comedy Bang! Bang!, David Wain of The State and Stella, Kyle Kinane, and Dave Hill), and other notables (wrestler Colt Cabana and internet cat celebrity Lil Bub). Organized by radio host Sean Cannon with production from musician Alexander Smith, all proceeds from sales were to be donated to Reading Is Fundamental.

See also
1985 Chicago Bears season

References

External links
 ESPN's Lyrics and Commentary
 An Oral History of ‘The Super Bowl Shuffle’

1985 National Football League season
1985 singles
Chicago Bears postseason
Novelty songs
Songs about Chicago
History of the Super Bowl
Football songs and chants
1985 songs